Mount Pearl is the third-largest settlement and second-largest city in Newfoundland and Labrador, Canada. The city is located southwest of St. John's, on the eastern tip of the Avalon Peninsula on the island of Newfoundland. Mount Pearl is the fourth largest settlement in the province and is part of the St. John's metropolitan area, the 20th largest metropolitan area in Canada.

History
Mount Pearl dates back to 1829, when Commander James Pearl and his wife, Lady Anne Pearl, arrived in Newfoundland with a Crown grant of one thousand acres (4 km²) of land, a reward for Commander Pearl's 27 years of distinguished service in the Royal Navy. In 1830, Commander Pearl built a house upon the most elevated section of his estate and named it Mount Cochrane in honour of then-governor Sir Thomas Cochrane.

After the governor left Newfoundland, Pearl renamed the site Mount Pearl. Pearl was made a Knight of the Royal Guelphic Order of Hanover and received the honour of Knight Bachelor from Queen Victoria. He died suddenly at his Mount Pearl estate on January 13, 1840, at the age of 50 years. In 1844, Sir James Pearl's wife, Lady Anne, moved to London, England. John Lester, who had come from Devonshire, England to work for James Pearl, continued working the Pearl Estate, leasing it from Lady Anne Pearl for another 14 years.

In her will, she left John Lester  of land called "Anna Vale", (present day Glendale) which he later sold. The Pearl estate eventually came into the hands of Andrew Glendinning, who worked it as successful farmland well into the 1920s. John Lester purchased other land (124 acres opposite the Pearl Estate on Brookfield Road) from Edward Dunscomb and later inherited another  on Old Placentia Road (present day Admiralty Wood) from Pearl's sister, Eunice Blamey.

John Lester died in 1893 leaving his estate, called "FairMead", to sons Ashton and James. Fairmead is the site of Lester's Market today.

Development
In the 1930s and 1940s, Mount Pearl became the meeting place of affluent members of society and lovers of horseracing. A large open air gallery, with benches for spectators to view surrounding lands was erected on "The Mount" in the 1940s. Horseracing continued to be prominent and Mount Pearl began to develop into something of a summer resort for St. John's residents. Increased population during summer months led to increased population year round and eventual residential and industrial development.

Incorporation
With the population growing quickly, there was increased demand for municipal government. As a result, Mount Pearl held its first election in 1955 which resulted in Hayward Burrage becoming the first mayor of the Town of Mount Pearl. The town was incorporated on January 11, 1955 and had population of 1,979. On July 21, 1988, the Town of Mount Pearl became the third community in Newfoundland and Labrador to be granted city status. Today, it remains one of the largest cities within the province, with a population in 2021 of 22,477.

Geography
Mount Pearl is located in the northeastern region of the Avalon Peninsula in southeast Newfoundland. It is landlocked, being about midway between the Atlantic Ocean coast to the east and Conception Bay to the west. The city is bounded on the north, south and east by the city of St. John's and on the west by the town of Paradise, which has led to limited availability of undeveloped land, forcing the city to adopt a more urban, high-density planning structure.

Southlands, a neighbourhood in St. John's was a large part of Mount Pearl's future growth plans for filling in the area between its boundary and Cochrane Pond Provincial Park. In 1998, the Provincial Government granted the land to the City of St. John's.

Climate
Mount Pearl has a humid continental climate (Dfb) with short, mild summers and long, cold winters.

Demographics 

In 2016, Mount Pearl was 92.7% White, 5.6% Aboriginal, and 1.7% other. The median age was 44.5 in 2016 and 41.6 in 2011. The median income was $78,232 before taxes in 2016, with a median income of $67,055 after taxes in 2016.

Government

Municipal
The city is represented by a mayor, deputy mayor and five councillors. Elections in Mount Pearl are held every four years on the last Tuesday in September, the last election was held on September 28, 2021. The current mayor, Dave Aker, has been in office since 2017.

Notable people
 David Cochrane, CBC News reporter and anchor 
 Zach Dean, pro hockey player in the Vegas Golden Knights system
 Brad Gushue, Canadian curler, three-time Tim Hortons Brier champion, and 2006 gold medal skip
 Terry Ryan, retired pro hockey player whose career included games with the Montreal Canadiens

References

External links

 
Cities in Newfoundland and Labrador
Populated places established in 1834